Alessandro Piccinelli (born 30 January 1997) is an Italian volleyball player who won 2021 European Championship.

Sporting achievements

Clubs

Italian Super Cup
  2022

FIVB Club World Championship
  Brazil 2022 – with Sir Safety Susa Perugia

References

External links
 

1997 births
Living people
Italian men's volleyball players
Sportspeople from Milan
Universiade medalists in volleyball
Universiade gold medalists for Italy
Medalists at the 2019 Summer Universiade